Senzousa was a town of ancient Lycaonia, inhabited in Byzantine times. The name does not occur among ancient authors but is inferred from epigraphic and other evidence.

Its site is located near Toprakkale, Asiatic Turkey.

References

Populated places in ancient Lycaonia
Former populated places in Turkey
Populated places of the Byzantine Empire
History of Konya Province